Tà Lài is a rural commune of Tân Phú District in Đồng Nai Province.

Most of the residents are the Ma and X'tieng ethnic minorities, who were re-settled after the establishment of Cát Tiên National Park.

References

Populated places in Đồng Nai province
Communes of Đồng Nai province